Elections in Maharashtra, a state in India, are conducted in accordance with the Constitution of India. The Assembly of Maharashtra creates laws regarding the conduct of local body elections unilaterally while any changes by the state legislature to the conduct of state level elections need to be approved by the Parliament of India. In addition, the state legislature may be dismissed by the Parliament according to Article 356 of the Indian Constitution and President's rule may be imposed.

Main political parties

"Draft:"

Lok Sabha elections
The 1951 and 1957 election are results from Bombay State which has sizable portions of Gujarat in it, but Marathwada and Vidarbha were not included. Maharashtra State was formed on 1 May 1960.

Table

As Bombay State

As Maharashtra

Vidhan Sabha elections

References

External links 
Maharashtra Election Results Counting Live
 Maharashtra Election Results 
 Election Commission of India